The Memphis Italian Festival is a weekend-long event held annually in [Memphis, Tennessee] the weekend after Memorial Day.

Background
Started in 1989, it takes place every year in Marquette Park, located in the middle of East Memphis on the corner of Mt. Moriah and Park. People from the entire Mid-South come to enjoy Italian culture for a weekend with activities and food. The festival is based on the values, beliefs, and traditions of the Italian-American culture present, especially in the Mid-South. 
The festival started in 1989. The proceeds from the Memphis Italian Festival go directly to the children attending the Holy Rosary Parish School, a Catholic elementary school in Memphis.

Due to the COVID-19 pandemic, no festival was held in 2020.

Activities
The city of Memphis regularly celebrates traditions dealing with music and food. The activities at the festival include live musical performances, consisting of both local and national bands. There are performances all three days of the weekend all throughout the day. Other forms of entertainment include the Coors Light Bocce Ball Tournament, the Galtelli Cup Recreational Bocce Tournament, carnival games, grape stomping, a volleyball tournament, and arts and crafts. Every year, teams also compete for the best gravy and the best homemade wine. The best booth at the festival and the best powder room also win competitions.

See also
Memphis in May, another event held during the same month as the Italian festival

References

Festivals in Tennessee
Italian Festival
Italian-American culture
Italian-American History in Memphis, Tennessee
1989 establishments in Tennessee